Guillaume Soisson (18 November 1866 – 27 August 1938) was a Luxembourgian engineer and politician for the Party of the Right.

A conservative, Soisson entered the cabinet of Hubert Loutsch in 1915 as the Director-General for Public Works and Director-General of Agriculture.  He resigned, along with the Prime Minister, on 24 February 1916.  He entered the cabinet for the second time, under Émile Reuter, as the Director-General for Public Works: replacing Guillaume Leidenbach, who had resigned on 14 April 1923.

Footnotes

|-

Ministers for Public Works of Luxembourg
Government ministers of Luxembourg
Party of the Right (Luxembourg) politicians
Luxembourgian engineers
Luxembourgian educators
1866 births
1938 deaths
People from Lorentzweiler
Alumni of the Athénée de Luxembourg
Ministers for Agriculture of Luxembourg